Howard-Suamico School District is a school district near Green Bay, Wisconsin that operates five elementary schools, one intermediate school, one middle school, and one high school. It serves the villages of Howard and Suamico.

With over 5,236 students served in eight schools, the school district is the 29th largest in Wisconsin, out of 426 districts.

Elementary schools 
Bay Harbor   
Forest Glen
Howard    
Meadowbrook
Suamico
Intermediate school
Lineville Intermediate School
Middle school
Bay View Middle School
High school
Bay Port High School

The superintendent of the district is Damian LaCroix (2009).

References

External links
 

School districts in Wisconsin
Education in Brown County, Wisconsin